Jon Unzaga Bombín (born August 20, 1962) is a former Spanish professional road racing cyclist.

Achievements and Awards

1988
2nd GP Villafranca de Ordizia
1989
7th Overall Euskal Bizikleta
9th Overall Vuelta a Murcia
1990
10th Trofeo Masferrer
1991
1st Stage 4 Euskal Bizikleta
1st Stage 2 Troféu Joaquim Agostinho
3rd Klasika Primavera
1992
1st Stage 8 Vuelta a España
 2nd Road race, National Road Championships
4th Overall Euskal Bizikleta
1993
1st Klasika Primavera
6th Vuelta a Murcia
1994
6th Subida al Naranco
1995
6th Overall Vuelta a los Valles Mineros

External links

Palmares

Cyclists from the Basque Country (autonomous community)
Spanish male cyclists
1962 births
Living people
Sportspeople from Álava